Dolichoderus attelaboides is a species of ant in the genus Dolichoderus. Described by Johan Christian Fabricius in 1775, the species is endemic to Bolivia, Brazil , Ecuador, French Guiana, Guyana, Peru, Suriname and Trinidad and Tobago.

References

Dolichoderus
Hymenoptera of South America
Insects described in 1775
Taxa named by Johan Christian Fabricius